Leptomyrmula is an extinct genus of ants of the subfamily Dolichoderinae. It contains a single described species Leptomyrmula maravignae, which was described before the genus existed in 1891.

References

†
Monotypic fossil ant genera
Fossil taxa described in 1891
Fossil taxa described in 1913